The Lambda Literary Award for Erotica is an annual literary award established in 2002 and presented by the Lambda Literary Foundation that awards books with LGBT characters and "whose content is principally of an erotic nature." "Anthologies, novels, novellas, graphic novels, memoirs, and short story collections" are eligible for the award.

The award has been presented in the following categories: Gay Erotica, Lesbian Erotica, and LGBTQ Erotica.

Recipients

References 

Erotica
Awards established in 2002
English-language literary awards
Lists of LGBT-related award winners and nominees
Erotic literature